TDG Limited was a goods transportation, distribution, warehousing and supply chain management company based in England with offices also in Ireland, Belgium, the Netherlands, Spain, Hungary and Germany.

History
The company was formed in 1922 as The General Lighterage Co Ltd. It was first listed on the London Stock Exchange in 1950, and changed its name to Transport Development Group in 1957. It started to expand into Europe in 1963, and acquired Van Straaten in the Netherlands in August 1999. The name changed to TDG plc in 2000.

The company acquired IWT Holdings, an Irish logistics business, in August 2001, Mond & Cie, a Belgian logistics business, in March 2006 and Doman S.A., a Spanish logistics business, in February 2007. In July 2008, TDG was taken private by the Laxey Investment Trust (later renamed Douglas Bay Capital) through Laxey Logistics and was subsequently removed from London Stock Exchange.

On 26 November 2010, Norbert Dentressangle reached an agreement to buy Laxey Logistics Ltd (which owns 100% of TDG Ltd and all its subsidiaries) from Douglas Bay Capital. The transaction was completed on 29 March 2011, following approval from the European Commission. TDG Limited became a subsidiary of XPO Logistics after Norbert Dentressangle was acquired by XPO Logistics in 2015.

Activities
The company is organised into four sectors; Transport and Distribution, Warehousing and Storage, International Services and Support Services  and offers the following services:

 Logistics warehousing and shared user warehousing  
 Transport logistics, hazardous goods transport, bulk and packed chemical transport  
 Distribution logistics, 3PL, High-Cube transport network  
 Flexible end to end supply chain management  
 Bulk chemical storage and hazardous goods warehousing  
 Temperature controlled warehousing and distribution 
 International freight forwarding by air, sea or road 
 4PL services that maximise efficiency and reduce costs 
 Customs brokerage services 
 Value added services including: tank cleaning, drumming, blending, mixing, contract packing and IBC cleaning and management.

References

External links
 Official site
 Catalogue of the TDG archives, held at the Modern Records Centre, University of Warwick

Transport operators of the United Kingdom
Business services companies established in 1922
Transport companies established in 1922
Transport companies disestablished in 2011
1922 establishments in England
2011 disestablishments in England